Besenello (Besenèl in local dialect) is a comune (municipality) in Trentino in the northern Italian region Trentino-Alto Adige/Südtirol, located about  south of Trento.  It is located at the entrance of the Vallagarina. The main attraction is the Castel Beseno, the largest fortified structure in Trentino and the Romanesque church of Sant'Agata.

Besenello borders the following municipalities: Trento, Vigolo Vattaro, Bosentino, Vattaro, Aldeno, Centa San Nicolò, Calliano, Nomi, and Folgaria.

References

External links
 Official website

Cities and towns in Trentino-Alto Adige/Südtirol